Ulrich Diesing (12 March 1911 – 17 April 1945) was a German pilot in the Luftwaffe during World War II. He was a recipient of the Knight's Cross of the Iron Cross of Nazi Germany. On 17 April 1945, Ulrich Diesing was killed in an accident near Boizenburg, Nazi Germany. During his career he was credited with 15 aerial victories.

Summary of career

Awards
 Spanish Cross in Gold with Swords
 Aviator badge
 Front Flying Clasp of the Luftwaffe
 Iron Cross (1939)
 2nd Class
 1st Class
 Knight's Cross of the Iron Cross on 6 September 1942 as Major and Geschwaderkommodore of Zerstörergeschwader 1

Dates of rank

References

Sources

 
 
 
 
 

1911 births
1945 deaths
People from Zielona Góra County
People from the Province of Brandenburg
German police officers
Luftwaffe World War II generals
German World War II flying aces
German military personnel of the Spanish Civil War
Recipients of the Knight's Cross of the Iron Cross
Road incident deaths in Germany
Major generals of the Luftwaffe